Stigmella lonicerarum is a moth of the family Nepticulidae. It is found from Sweden and Finland to the Pyrenees, Italy and Bulgaria, and from France to Russia.

The wingspan is 4–5 mm.

The larvae feed on Lonicera caprifolium, Lonicera nigra and Lonicera xylosteum. They mine the leaves of their host plant. The mine consists of a long, narrow corridor, which follows the leaf margin at first. The frass is concentrated in a narrow central line.

External links
Fauna Europaea
bladmineerders.nl

Nepticulidae
Moths of Europe
Moths described in 1856